Sancho Creek is a tributary of Middle Island Creek,  long, in northwestern West Virginia in the United States.

Sancho Creek's course and watershed are entirely in Tyler County.

According to the Geographic Names Information System, Sancho Creek has also been known historically by the spelling "Sanco Creek."

See also
List of rivers of West Virginia

References 

Rivers of West Virginia
Rivers of Tyler County, West Virginia